Survival of the Fattest is a compilation album released by the Fat Wreck Chords record label on March 12, 1996. It was the second installment in the Fat Music series.

Track listing

References

Fat Music compilations
1996 compilation albums